JSC Rosoboronexport (Rosoboroneksport) is the sole state intermediary agency for Russia's exports/imports of defense-related and dual use products, technologies and services. The Rosoboronexport Federal State Unitary Enterprise (FSUE) was set up in 2000 by a Decree of the President of Russia and is charged with implementation of the policy of the State in the area of military-technical cooperation between Russia and foreign countries. In 2007, the enterprise was re-registered as Rosoboronexport Open joint-stock company (OJSC). In 2011, Rostekhnologii non-profit state corporation acquired 100% of Rosoboronexport OJSC.

The official status of Rosoboronexport guarantees the support of the Russian Government in all export operations.
The Rosoboronexport State Corporation is exclusively entitled to supply the international market the whole range of Russian armaments officially allowed for export.

Rosoboronexport is ranked among the leading operators in the international arms market. The status of a state intermediary agency provides the corporation with unique opportunities in expanding and strengthening long-term mutually beneficial cooperation with foreign partners. Rosoboronexport presently cooperates with Selex ES of Italy, Navantia of Spain, Thales Optronics of France and others. India is a major customer, other leading customers include China, Algeria, Syria, Vietnam, Venezuela and recently Iraq.

History

Rosoboronexport is a legal successor of the state arms exporters which existed in the ex-USSR and present-day Russia. A state intermediary agency in the military-technical area was first created on 8 May 1953, when the General Engineering Department within the Ministry of Internal and Foreign Trade of the USSR was founded in accordance with the decision of the Soviet Government.

With the scope of military industrial complex expanding, a number of new specialized export agencies were set up. By the late 1990s, there were two state intermediary companies in the country, Rosvooruzhenie and Promexport. On 4 November 2000, the two state-owned companies were merged by Decree №1834 of the Russian President, establishing the Rosoboronexport Unitary enterprise as the sole state intermediary agency for Russia's military exports/imports.

On 4 August 2006, the Bush administration imposed sanctions on Rosoboronexport accusing it of supplying Iran in violation of the United States Iran Nonproliferation Act of 2000. The Russian defense ministry said the move reflected U.S. annoyance at arms sales to Venezuela. Rosoboronexport was prohibited from doing business with the Federal government of the United States from 2008 until 2010, when the U.S. lifted such sanctions in response to Russian support for a UN resolution concerning Iran's nuclear program.

Rosoboronexport obtained an 66% stake in VSMPO-AVISMA during October 2006 and in November 2006 Sergey Chemezov became chairman of VSMPO-AVISMA.

On 19 January 2007, Russian President Vladimir Putin signed a decree making Rosoboronexport responsible for all arms exports.

It was reported that Rosoboronexport was to be folded into a state holding company called Rostec by the end of the year 2007.

On 18 September 2008 it was reported that Rosoboronexport had agreed the sale of advanced S-300 Russian made anti-aircraft systems to Iran in light of the news that the United States had agreed to supply Israel with GBU-39s (Small Diameter Bunker Buster Bombs)

The 2011 volume of military supplies to foreign customers made by Rosoboronexport was US$10.7 billion considering the expected US$9.19 billion. A continuous increase in sales (US$2 billion in 2011) makes Russia the second largest exporter of military products after the USA. In 2012, the export revenues from Russian-made weapons was US$15.2 billion, and the order portfolio for Russian military products reached US$46.3 billion.

In 2012, Rosoboronexport was widely reported to be Syria’s main weapons supplier, but Russia maintains that its arms deals with the Syrian government are based on longstanding contracts between the two countries. Russia holds that the weapons sold to Syria are purely defensive in nature, cannot be used against civilians, and are primarily air defense installations. The refurbishment of Russian-made helicopters, and the delivery of S-300 anti-aircraft missiles caused great international attention. The US, Germany and Israel were all opposed to weapons transfers to Syria.

In July 2013, Rosoboronexport recorded $34 billion in orders for 66 countries.

On 26 December 2017, Angola's first satellite Angosat 1 was launched from the Baikonur Cosmodrome. Rosoboronexport served as the leader of the project team. The contract which began in 2009 was worth an estimated US$328 million.

Russia delivered land troops' hardware worth $2.5 bln to foreign customers in 2020. Rosoboronexport signed 13 export contracts on defense supplies of 1 bln euro worth at the MAKS-2021 international air show. The contracts concern the Sukhoi Su-30SME fighter aircraft, Mi-35M and Mi-17V5 helicopters, Protivnik-GE radars, Verba MANPADS as well as air weapons, armored and automobile vehicles. As part of the Army-2021 International Military-Technical Forum, Rosoboronexport signed about 20 contract documents totaling over 2 billion euros for aircraft of the Su-30 type, Mi-35P, Mi-171Sh and Mi-17V-5 helicopters, aircraft weapons, the Pantsir-S1 / S1M anti-aircraft missile and cannon system, mobile electronic warfare systems "Krasukha" and "Repellent-Patrol", the Kornet-EM anti-tank missile system, remotely controlled combat modules, weapons for ships and submarines, small arms, various ammunition.

In August 2021, Rosoboronexport recorded $52.1 billion in orders for 61 countries. The share of the Asia-Pacific region reaches around 50% as of September 2021. During the Dubai Airshow 2021, Rosoboronexport signed contracts for the supply of aircraft worth over $1.3 bln. It includes combat aircraft, helicopters, drones, engines.

In 2022, Rosoboronexport started to promote the Orlan-30 UAV, the Ballista remotely-controlled combat module, and the Chukavin sniper rifle, among others.

Management
The founding director of Rosvooruzhenie, appointed in 1993, was Viktor I. Samoilov. He was followed by Aleksandr Kotelkin. Sergey Chemezov was the Director General of Rosoboronexport during 2004–2007, Anatoly Isaikin came after.

United States sanctions
On 16 July 2014, the Obama administration imposed sanctions through the US Department of Treasury's Office of Foreign Assets Control (OFAC) by adding Rosoboronexport and other entities to the Specially Designated Nationals List (SDN) in retaliation for the ongoing Russo-Ukrainian War.

See also
List of countries by arms exports

References

Sources
David R. Stone, "Rosvooruzhenie and Russia's Return to the Global Arms Market," in Perspectives on Political and Economic Transformations after Communism (New York, 1997), pp. 77–90.

External links

 Rosoboronexport official site

Government of Russia
Rostec
Companies based in Moscow
Golden Idea national award winners
Russian entities subject to the U.S. Department of the Treasury sanctions
Military–industrial complex